Demmin may refer to:

Places
 Demmin, town in Mecklenburg-Western Pomerania, Germany
 Demmin (district), Mecklenburg-Western Pomerania, Germany
 Duchy of Demmin, one of the partitions of the Duchy of Pomerania

People
 Demmin (surname)
 Casimir I of Demmin, also known as Casimir I, Duke of Pomerania
 Casimir II of Demmin, also known as Casimir II, Duke of Pomerania
 Hans Joachim von Rohr-Demmin (1888-1971), German politician
 Wartislaw III of Demmin, also known as Wartislaw III, Duke of Pomerania